Eureka Springs School District is a public school district located in Eureka Springs, Arkansas, United States.

Schools 
The Eureka Springs School District provides education programs at three educational facilities:

 Eureka Springs High School—Serving high school students in grades 9–12.
 Eureka Springs Middle School—Serving middle school students in grades 5–8.
 Eureka Springs Elementary School—Serving elementary school students in grades PreKindergarten–4.

References

External links 
 

School districts in Arkansas
Education in Carroll County, Arkansas
Eureka Springs, Arkansas